Oldbury is a small village in Shropshire, England, situated approximately  south of the market town of Bridgnorth. It is included in the Bridgnorth civil parish; the civil parish of Oldbury (covering 817 acres) was abolished in 1967. The village remains separated from the town however and has a distinct character.

The village is linked to the town by the modern B4363 road, though the original route linking the two settlements is now cut in half by the Bridgnorth by-pass (the A458 road). However, as there is a footbridge crossing the A458 it is still possible for pedestrians and cyclists to follow the old route, which goes up Manor Farm Lane, splits to the right down the hill towards the by-pass, and continues on the Bridgnorth side down Oldbury Wells towards Hollybush Road. The Mercian Way (National Cycle Route 45) follows part of this route, from Manor Farm Lane, over the bypass and then through Oldbury Wells.

Oldbury also contains an old church, dedicated to Saint Nicholas, which features beautiful stained-glass windows depicting Biblical scenes, with a west window, dedicated in 1919 as a parish First World War memorial depicting St Alban and St Martin of Tours and accompanied by a wooden board listing 13 men who died serving in that war. From the church there is an old raised pathway across fields towards Bridgnorth, now rarely walked upon though still visible, known traditionally as the "Coffin Way". Coffins were brought from Bridgnorth by mourners, as at one time they could be buried at St Nicholas's for free whereas there was a fee in Bridgnorth churchyards.

The village lies on a notable hillside, which slopes down from Henley Lodge (at 102m above sea level) towards the River Severn, which flows to the east of the village, with the lower parts of the settlement at approximately 60m. The village is quite spread out, with a number of small country lanes and paddocks within the general boundaries. Between Oldbury and the River Severn is the Severn Valley Railway.

Oldbury Wells lies within the Bridgnorth by-pass and is now effectively part of the town. It has one of the town's two secondary schools, Oldbury Wells School.

See also
Listed buildings in Bridgnorth

References

External links

Bridgnorth Team Ministry website St Nicholas Church, Oldbury

Villages in Shropshire
Former civil parishes in Shropshire
Bridgnorth